"Breezedale", also known as Sutton-Elkin House, is an historic home located on the campus of Indiana University of Pennsylvania in Indiana, Indiana County, Pennsylvania.

It was added to the National Register of Historic Places in 1979.

History and architectural features
Built between 1865 and 1868, Breezedale has a two-and-one-half-story, twenty-by-thirty-foot, brick main building, which was designed in a Late Victorian-Italianate-style.

Attached to the main section are a twelve-by-eighteen-foot wood addition and two brick extensions. The home features a classic portico and cupola, and has been used as a dormitory and for classroom space, since becoming a part of the university sometime after 1915. 

Added to the National Register of Historic Places in 1979, it is now home to the Breezedale Alumni Center.

References

Indiana University of Pennsylvania
Indiana, Pennsylvania
Houses on the National Register of Historic Places in Pennsylvania
Italianate architecture in Pennsylvania
Houses completed in 1868
Houses in Indiana County, Pennsylvania
National Register of Historic Places in Indiana County, Pennsylvania